Rafael Matos and Felipe Meligeni Alves were the defending champions but only Meligeni Alves chose to defend his title, partnering Matheus Pucinelli de Almeida. They withdrew before their first round match.

Karol Drzewiecki and Piotr Matuszewski won the title after defeating Facundo Díaz Acosta and Luis David Martínez 6–4, 6–4 in the final.

Seeds

Draw

References

External links
 Main draw

Uruguay Open - Doubles
2022 Doubles
Uruguay_Open_–_Doubles